Walther Fröstell (15 February 1913 – 11 February 2010) was a Swedish sport shooter who competed in the 1948 Summer Olympics, in the 1952 Summer Olympics, and in the 1960 Summer Olympics.

References

1913 births
2010 deaths
Swedish male sport shooters
ISSF rifle shooters
Olympic shooters of Sweden
Shooters at the 1948 Summer Olympics
Shooters at the 1952 Summer Olympics
Shooters at the 1960 Summer Olympics
20th-century Swedish people